Orfield Laboratories is a Minneapolis building used for product development and research. It was founded by Steven J Orfield. Inside the building is anechoic chamber that is one of the quietest places on earth, absorbing 99.9% of sound. The room attracts media attention and inspires rumors and speculation about the psychological effects of spending time in silence.

Building 
The building, located in the Seward neighborhood of Minneapolis, was built in 1970 and originally served as a recording studio called Sound 80. It hosted musicians like Bob Dylan and Prince, and it's where the 1980 single Funkytown was recorded. In 1990, Steven J Orfield bought the building with the intention of using it for his company's research and development. In 1994, he took his anechoic chamber out of storage and put it in the building.

The building is windowless with hallways and isolated rooms of varying sizes.

Anechoic chamber
Orfield purchased the anechoic chamber in the 1980s when Sunbeam closed its Chicago facilities. He paid University of Chicago football team members to disassemble the chamber and load it onto three semi-trucks. He kept it in a storage locker before moving it to the Orfield Laboratories building in 1994. Orfield told The New York Times that product design workers have used the chamber to improve the sounds of consumer products including Sleep Number mattresses and Whirlpool dishwashers.

The chamber is a six-sided steel-walled box. It is suspended by springs inside a five sided steel-walled box. Those two boxes are inside inside the laboratory, which has 12-inch concrete walls. The door to the anechoic chamber is made of steel.

Inside the room, people report hearing the sound of their own blood and other bodily function. The Star Tribune wrote that visitors felt as though the chamber had "reset their brains."

Publicity 
For five years, Orfield offered Friday afternoon tours to anyone who donated $20 to a local food pantry. But once the site attracted international attention, he started charging more. As of August 2022, tours cost a minimum of $200 per person with a $400 minimum.

In 2022, rumors spread on TikTok and YouTube that there was a cash prize for spending a long time in the room. While no such competition existed, the Orfield company’s website descripes "The Orfield Challenge" in which people can pay $600 an hour to be in the chamber.

Quietest place on earth 
Orfield Labs held the 2005 and 2013 Guinness World Record for the quietest place on Earth. Microsoft’s anechoic chamber in Redmond, Washington eventually beat Orfield.

References 

Minneapolis–Saint Paul
Challenges
Office buildings in Minnesota
Office buildings in Minneapolis